Susan Elizabeth Gardiner is a New Zealand horticultural scientist, who works on using genetics and genomics for fruit breeding. Gardiner has received multiple awards. Gardiner has been a Fellow of the Royal Society Te Apārangi since 2020 and is a Fellow of the International Society for Horticultural Science. She is an Honorary Fellow of Plant & Food Research.

Early life and education 
Gardiner grew up on a family farm in Waiau, North Canterbury, and was homeschooled until the age of ten. She was later educated at St Margaret's College in Christchurch, and earned a PhD in biochemistry at the University of Otago. Her thesis, submitted in 1977, was titled Studies on the biochemical basis for the photoperiodic control of flowering.

Career 
Gardiner worked at Plant and Food Research from 1980 until her retirement in 1991. She founded the Mapping & Markers Team. Gardiner is known for her work using genetic markers to assist fruit breeding. She developed a high-throughput platform to create new varieties of apple and kiwifruit in a more precise way, so that growers could target specific qualities to advantage growers and consumers. For instance, by specifying desired colour, texture or pest resistance. Gardiner's research is credited with leading to New Zealand's status as an international leader in the breeding and genomics of apple and kiwifruit. In her retirement, Gardiner is an Honorary Fellow of Plant & Food Research and continues to work. Gardiner is involved in molecular genetics of Rhododendron for conservation purposes.

Awards and honours 
Gardiner won the Outstanding International Horticulturist Award of the American Society for Horticultural Science in 2009.

Gardiner received a Science New Zealand Plant & Food Research Lifetime Achievement Award in 2017. She was a member of the PSA Response Team, that won the Prime Minister’s Science Prize in 2017. 

Gardiner was elected as a Fellow of the Royal Society Te Apārangi in 2020. Her new fellows seminar was titled "Better Cultivars Faster". She is also a Fellow of the International Society for Horticultural Science.

Selected works

References 

Fellows of the Royal Society of New Zealand
New Zealand horticulturists
University of Otago alumni
People educated at St Margaret's College
People from North Canterbury
People associated with Department of Scientific and Industrial Research (New Zealand)
Year of birth missing (living people)
Living people